4J Studios Limited is a British video game developer based in Dundee. It has a second office located in East Linton. Founded in April 2005 by VIS Entertainment alumni Chris van der Kuyl, Paddy Burns and Frank Arnot, the company is best known for porting Minecraft to consoles and handheld platforms.

History 
4J Studios was founded by Chris van der Kuyl, Paddy Burns and Frank Arnot on 19 April 2005, twelve days after van der Kuyl's previous video game venture, VIS Entertainment, entered into administration. All three were previously employed by that company, of which van der Kuyl as president and chief executive officer.

In November 2012, co-founder and studio director Arnot announced that he had left 4J Studios to establish Stormcloud Games with co-workers Andy West and Pat McGovern. In March 2018, 4J Studios invested a "six-figure sum" in Puny Astronaut, a Dundee-based developer founded by Abertay University alumni. 4J Studios' van der Kuyl and Burns subsequently joined that company's board of directors, of which van der Kuyl also became their chairman. 4J Studios then opened an investment fund, Chroma Ventures, in March 2021, which absorbed the Puny Astronaut stake and invested in several other studios. In October 2022, 4J Studios announced its intent to start publishing games, starting with Puny Astronaut's Skye Tales in 2023.

Games developed

References

External links 
 

2005 establishments in Scotland
Companies based in Dundee
Privately held companies of Scotland
Software companies of Scotland
Video game companies established in 2005
Video game companies of the United Kingdom
Video game development companies